The athletics competition at the 2001 European Youth Summer Olympic Festival was held from 22 to 26 July. The events took place at the Estadio de Atletismo Monte Romero in Murcia, Spain. Boys and girls born 1984 or 1985 or later participated 31 track and field events, with similar programmes for the sexes with the exception of no steeplechase event for girls.

Medal summary

Men

Women

References

Results
2001 European Youth Olympics. World Junior Athletics History. Retrieved on 2014-11-25.
European Youth Olympics. GBR Athletics. Retrieved on 2014-11-25.

2001 European Youth Summer Olympic Festival
European Youth Summer Olympic Festival
2001
2001 European Youth Summer Olympic Festival
2001 European Youth Summer Olympics Festival